Alexander Alexandrovich Samonov (born 23 August 1995) is a Russian professional ice hockey goaltender currently playing for Severstal Cherepovets of the Kontinental Hockey League (KHL).

In the midst of his fourth season with SKA Saint Petersburg in 2022–23, having made 14 appearances, Samonov was traded to fellow KHL club, Severstal Cherepovets, alongside Daniil Pylenkov, in exchange for goaltender Vladislav Podyapolski on 14 November 2022.

International play

 

 

On 23 January 2022, Samonov was named to the roster to represent Russian Olympic Committee athletes at the 2022 Winter Olympics.

Career statistics

Regular season and playoffs

International

References

External links
 

1995 births
Living people
Russian ice hockey goaltenders
HC Dinamo Saint Petersburg players
Severstal Cherepovets players
SKA Saint Petersburg players
THK Tver players
HC Vityaz players
Ice hockey people from Moscow
Universiade medalists in ice hockey
Universiade gold medalists for Russia
Competitors at the 2017 Winter Universiade
Ice hockey players at the 2022 Winter Olympics
Medalists at the 2022 Winter Olympics
Olympic silver medalists for the Russian Olympic Committee athletes
Olympic medalists in ice hockey
Olympic ice hockey players of Russia